Robin Rochelle Stille (November 24, 1961 – February 9, 1996) was an American actress known for her role in the 1982 slasher film The Slumber Party Massacre as Valerie "Val" Bates. She was sometimes credited as Robin Rochelle.

Life and career
Stille was born in Philadelphia, Pennsylvania and eventually found her way to Hollywood after moving with her family as a child. After starring in The Slumber Party Massacre, she went on to star in the film Sorority Babes in the Slimeball Bowl-O-Rama as Babs Peterson.  Some of her other roles include the 1987 films Vampire Nights and Winners Take All, as well as in an episode of Jake and the Fatman, and in the 1991 film American Ninja 4: The Annihilation.

Roles eventually became hard to come by for Stille, which, in addition to her drinking, reportedly led to her suicide in Burbank, California on February 9, 1996, at the age of 34.  She was buried at Rose Hills Memorial Park in Whittier, California. The book Carnal Capers in Canton, Ohio, Book Two: Logorrhea, by Rhonda K. Baughman, is dedicated to her memory.

Filmography

Film

Television

References

External links

Robin Stille at racksandrazors.com

American film actresses
American television actresses
Actresses from Philadelphia
Suicides in California
1961 births
1996 deaths
20th-century American actresses
Burials at Rose Hills Memorial Park
1996 suicides